Vyzas F.C. is a Greek football club based in Megara, Greece.  It was founded in 1928.

History
Vyzas Megaron was founded in 1928 by students and named after the ancient Megara hero Byzas. In 1960, the club was promoted to Greece's Beta Ethniki, where it stayed for seven years. Vyzas was later promoted to Greece's top league, Alpha Ethniki, where it played for four years. Its best result was seventh.

Between 1970 and 1975 and between 1979 and 1983, Vyzas played in Beta Ethniki. The team played for four years in Gamma Ethniki from 1983 to 1987. After 12 years in Amateur championships and four years in Delta Ethniki, the team moved to Gamma Ethniki in the summer of 2002 which they would remain until 2011.  During that season, the team finished 14th along with Larissa, later in the 2009–10 season, their 2nd place was tied with Kallithea. Vyzas played with Trikala, the 2nd team of the North group to the neutral stadium of Panionios at Nea Smyrni. Vyzas was losing 1–0 till 90th minute where the Megara team had a genuine chance, which was stopped by a handball, as Megarians said, but the referee gave nothing. Trikala won the game by 2–0 and the next season took part at Beta Ethniki. In 2011, the team finished 2nd in the South Group and entered the Football League where they remain until 2013 where they finished 19th.

As a historical team Vyzas has its big rivalries with other teams such as Korinthos, Panachaiki, the Patras-based team, and Aentas Salaminas which is based at an island nearby Megara called Salamina. At the 2009–2010 season Vyzas and Panachaiki were the two first teams of the South Group and was fighting for the first and the promotion to Beta ethniki. They played an extremely important match very late in the season, in the crowded Megara stadium. About 3000 Megarians made a fantastic atmosphere supporting their team but finally game ended 0–0. Vyzas didn't make it to gain promotion that season.

Stadium
The Stadium of Megara, the home of Megara team is located in the centre of the city, and its capacity is 2,350. Although, from the 2012–13 season, Vyzas is playing to "Primary Stadium of Megara" which is at the west of the city and it is the main training ground of the other Megara-based team, A.O.Megaron, a very successful team in basketball and athletics.

Honours
Domestic (Piraeus FCA):
Overall titles: Winners (5):
Piraeus Fourth Division (1'):
1958
Piraeus Third Division (1):
1959
'Piraeus A2 Division (1):
1960
Piraeus Premier Division (2):
1961, 1962
West Attica Premier Division (1):
2022

Domestic (Piraeus FCA):
Cups:   Winners (2): 1958, 1959

Season to season

1957–58: Piraeus FCA Fourth Division
1958–59: Piraeus FCA Third Division
1959–60: Piraeus FCA A2 Division
1960–62: Piraeus FCA Premier Division and Beta Ethiniki
1962–66: Beta Ethniki
1966–70: Alpha Ethiniki
1970–75: Beta Ethniki
1975–78: Piraeus FCA Premier Division and Gamma Ethniki
1978–79: Gamma Ethniki
1979–83: Beta Ethniki
1983–87: Gamma Ethniki
1987–88: Delta Ethniki
1988–90: Piraeus (and West Attica) FCA Premier Division
1990–92: Delta Ethniki
1992–98: Piraeus (and West Attica) FCA Premier Division
1998–2002: Delta Ethniki
2002–11: Gamma Ethniki (Football League 2 from 2005)
2011–14: Football League
2014–16: Gamma Ethniki
2016–22: West Attica FCA
2022-23: Gamma Ethniki

Staff
Owners:
 
Chairmen:
 Gianna RIga
Managers:
 Dimitrios Kalikas

Former players

For details on former players, see :Category:Vyzas F.C. players.

References

External links
Official website 

Football clubs in Attica
West Attica
Association football clubs established in 1928
1928 establishments in Greece